Nzema District is a former district council that was located in Western Region, Ghana. Originally created as an district council in 1975. However on 1988, it was split off into two new district assemblies: Jomoro District (capital: Half Assini) and Nzema East District (capital: Axim). The district council was located in the southern part of Western Region and had Half Assini as its capital town.

References

Districts of the Western Region (Ghana)